Edenhouse Point is a cape in the U.S. state of North Carolina.

Edenhouse Point has the name of Charles Eden, 2nd Governor of North Carolina, whose estate once stood nearby.

References

Landforms of Bertie County, North Carolina
Headlands of North Carolina